The Oklahoma State Budget for Fiscal Year 2001, was the spending request by Governor Frank Keating to fund government operations for July 1, 2000–June 30, 2001. Governor Keating and legislative leader approved the budget in May 2000. This was Governor Keating's sixth budget submitted as governor.

Figures shown in the spending request do not reflect the actual appropriations for Fiscal Year 2001, which must be authorized by the Legislature.

Total Revenue
All revenue of the fiscal year 2001 totaled $5.4 billion.

Total Spending
The Governor's budget for 2001 totaled $5.4 billion in spending. The budget request is broken down by the following expenditures:

 
Appropriations by Cabinet Department: 5.4 billion
$2.97 billion - Education
$1.24 billion - Health and Human Services
$541 million - Safety and Security
$311 million - Transportation
$78.7 million - Finance and Revenue
$74.9 million - Commerce and Tourism
$59.1 million - Judiciary
$37.6 million - Agriculture
$33.9 million - Legislature
$25.4 million - Human Resources and Administration
$23.4 million - Veterans Affairs
$17.1 million - Environment
$12.2 million - Science and Technology
$8.8 million - Secretary of State
$8.6 million - Energy
$7.7 million - Military
$3.2 million - Governor and Lieutenant Governor

Appropriations by agency: $5.4 billion
$1.98 billion - Department of Education
$833 million - State Regents for Higher Education
$391 million - Department of Human Services
$390 million - Department of Corrections
$384 million - Health Care Authority
$311 million - Department of Transportation
$138 million - Department of Mental Health and Substance Abuse Services
$129 million - Department of Career and Technology Education
$100 million - Office of Juvenile Affairs
$70 million - Department of Public Safety
$70 million - Department of Health
$59 million - Judiciary
$51 million - Tax Commission
$34 million - Legislature
$32 million - Department of Tourism and Recreation
$31 million - District Attorneys Council
$30 million - Department of Agriculture
$26 million - Department of Commerce
$25 million - Department of Rehabilitation Services
$23 million - Department of Veterans Affairs
$251 million - All Other Agencies

References

External links
Oklahoma Office of State Finance official website
Fiscal Year 2001 Budget information from the Oklahoma Senate

 
2001 in Oklahoma
Oklahoma state budget